Masclat is a commune in the Lot department in south-western France. It has an area of 1,002 ha.

See also
 Communes of the Lot department

References

External links

 Masclat website 

Communes of Lot (department)